The 1959 season was the Hawthorn Football Club's 35th season in the Victorian Football League and 58th overall.

Fixture

Night Series

Premiership Season

Ladder

References

Hawthorn Football Club seasons